The Helvetia was an express train that, for most of its existence, linked Hamburg-Altona station in Hamburg, Germany, with Zürich HB in Zurich, Switzerland.  Introduced in 1952, it was operated by the Deutsche Bundesbahn / Deutsche Bahn (DB) and the Swiss Federal Railways (SBB-CFF-FFS).  The train's name, Helvetia, is the Latin word for "Switzerland".

Initially, the Helvetia was a Schnellzug (D), later a Fernschnellzug (F - although actually diesel multiple units were used on this service).  In 1957, it became a first-class-only Trans Europ Express (TEE). On 27 May 1979, it was reclassified as a two-class Intercity (IC), and on 31 May 1987, it was included in the then-new EuroCity (EC) network.  Following a brief hiatus in 1991–1992, it was reintroduced as an Intercity-Express (ICE).  It ceased to be a named train at the end of 2002.

On 12 August 1965, the Helvetia was involved in a serious collision in Lampertheim, Hesse, in which the train formation (consist) was severely damaged, and four people died.

See also

History of rail transport in Germany
History of rail transport in Switzerland
List of named passenger trains of Europe

References

Notes

Bibliography

External links

EuroCity
Intercity Express
International named passenger trains
Named passenger trains of Germany
Named passenger trains of Switzerland
Trans Europ Express
Railway services introduced in 1952
Railway services discontinued in 2002